Dreketi F.C. is a Fijian football team based in Labasa playing in the Senior Division of the Fiji Football Association competitions. Dreketi is a district in the Province of Macuata which in the island of Vanua Levu in Fiji. The team is currently playing in the National Football League.

Their uniform includes black and white striped shirt.

History 
The Dreketi Soccer Association was formed in 1995, under the presidency of Prem Chand. The team was coached by Johan Leewai Till 2018, After he moved to Labasa F.C.

Current squad
As of 9 October 2018

See also 
 Fiji Football Association

Bibliography 
 M. Prasad, Sixty Years of Soccer in Fiji 1938 – 1998: The Official History of the Fiji Football Association, Fiji Football Association, Suva, 1998.

Football clubs in Fiji
1995 establishments in Fiji